Pannaxiakos V.C. is the volleyball team of the Greek sports club Pannaxiakos A.O.N. It was founded in 2006. The club is based in Naxos. Over the years they have been one of the greatest teams in Cyclades.

The club's finest hour came when the women's team won the A2 League, the second tier of Greek Volleyball taking promotion for the first time in their history for the A1, the top league of Greek Volleyball. The most historical achievement is going to be the teams participation to the Final 4 of the Greek Cup.

In the past, was department of Pannaxiakos A.O., when merged in 2006 with A.O. Naxos 2004.

Women's volleyball team squad
Season 2016–2017, as of January 2017.

 
|}

Honours

Domestic competitions
 A2
 Winners (1): 2012
 Greek Women's Volleyball Cup
 Finalists (2): 2014, 2017

European competitions
 Women's Challenge Cup:
 Quarter-finals (1): 2011–12

References

External links

ΕΣΚ Κυκλάδων
Ε.Ο.ΠΕ.
sportcyclades.gr

Greek volleyball clubs
Naxos